The tallest completed building in the U.S. city of Austin, Texas is the 58-story Independent, which is  tall. Completed in 2019, it is the tallest building in Texas outside of Houston and Dallas and the tallest all-residential tower west of the Mississippi River. The fifth-tallest building is the Frost Bank Tower, which was Austin's tallest structure from 2004 until 2008.

The history of skyscrapers in Austin began with the construction of the Scarbrough Building in 1910, which is often regarded as the first skyscraper built in the city. Austin went through a skyscraper boom in the 1970s and 1980s, which resulted in the construction of more than 15 of the tallest buildings in the city. Since 2007, the city has been going through a second building boom, with a multitude of buildings constructed, including The Independent, The Austonian and 360 Condominiums. As of February 2020, the city of Austin has 170 high rises.

Tallest buildings 
This includes spires and architectural details but does not include antenna masts or other objects not part of the original plans. The "Year" column indicates the year in which a building was completed.

Tallest buildings: site prep or under construction
The following are projects which will rise at least 300 ft (91 m).

Tallest buildings: approved, site plan under review or proposed
The following are projects which are to rise at least 300 ft (91 m).

* Table entries with dashes (-) indicate that information regarding building heights or dates of completion has not yet been released

Timeline of tallest buildings
This list includes buildings that have held the title of the tallest building (as measured by architectural height and not tip or roof height) in Austin as well as the current titleholder, The Independent.

See also

 List of tallest buildings in Texas
 List of tallest buildings in the United States
 List of tallest structures in the United States
 List of tallest buildings in Dallas
 List of tallest buildings in El Paso
 List of tallest buildings in Houston
 List of tallest buildings in San Antonio
 List of tallest buildings in Corpus Christi

References
 General
 
 Specific

External links
 Diagram of Austin skyscrapers on SkyscraperPage

Austin
Austin
 
Tallest buildings